Bryales is an order of mosses.

Taxonomy

The order Bryales includes the following five families:

 Bryaceae  
 Leptostomataceae 
 Mniaceae  
 Phyllodrepaniaceae  
 Pulchrinodaceae 

The order used to be defined broadly to include the Rhizogoniales, but is now used in a narrower sense. A species of the Mniaceae genus Rhizomnium, Rhizomnium dentatum, was described from fossil gametophytes preserved in Baltic amber.

The families Catoscopiaceae and Pseudoditrichaceae were previously placed in Bryales, but are now placed in Dicranidae as part of an early branching grade.

References

 
Moss orders